Talia in the Kitchen is an American telenovela-formatted teen sitcom that premiered on Nickelodeon on July 6, 2015. It was an adaptation of the Nickelodeon Latin American telenovela, Toni, la Chef, and was created by Mariela Romero & Catharina Ledeboer, the same writers who made Every Witch Way & WITS Academy.

On March 4, 2015, Nickelodeon ordered 40 episodes for the series, all the episodes making up the first season. The season premiered on July 6, 2015, and continued on November 30, 2015. Before the next set of episodes, a sneak peek of the set aired on November 25, 2015. A majority of the episodes aired in July and December 2015. Very few episodes were shown in-between those months. On January 12, 2016, it was confirmed that the show was cancelled.

Plot
14-year-old Talia Parra has her passion for cooking take flight when she and her younger sister visit their grandmother in Miami for the summer and later move in with her. With help from her new friends and her late father's magical spices, Talia revives business in her family restaurant by cooking truly life-changing meals that are just what each customer needs.

Cast and characters
Talia Parra (Maria Quezada): An optimistic girl who loves everything and is fond of cooking at Lola's, her family's restaurant. She is rivals with Debbie Fuccinelli. Talia finds magic spices hidden by her father and discovers that she is a SpiceMaster, able to use these spices to their full effect.
Deborah "Debbie" Fuccinelli (Gail Soltys): Talia's main competitor who works at the rival restaurant Fuccinelli's. Debbie is insecure, and becomes obsessed with destroying Lola's to prove that she is a better chef than Talia.
Julie Parra (Galilea La Salvia): Talia's younger sister, a serious and mature child prodigy who proves to be a master chef.
Rudy Rosales (Joshua Hoffman): Talia's best friend and later love interest. He is great at fixing things, and popularizes Mexican music in Miami.
Valerie Landry (Ellis Ann Jackson): Talia's best friend, who compulsively tells the truth and is afraid of committing any crimes.
Tyson Fuccinelli (Liam Obergfoll): Debbie's twin brother, and the love interest of Talia.
Federico "Frenchie" Fuccinelli (Miguel Luciano): Debbie's cousin and the head chef of the Fuccinelli's Restaurant, who is shown to be an egotistical perfectionist.
Dolores Parra (Jeannette Lehr): Talia and Julie's grandmother who taught Talia how to cook. She was the owner of Lola's until it was closed down by the Fuccinellis.
Rocky Palroso (Ethan Estrada): A 12-year-old boy whom Julie meets at the local community center. He has a crush on Julie, and has helped the Parra family many times, always stating that he "knows a guy."
Avery (Marika Dumancas): Debbie's vain and sarcastic best friend.
Jayden (William Wilson) and  Michael Grubb (Cooper Rowe): Two brothers introduced in the episode "Storm and Grubb". Together they run a food truck called Brothers in Grubb. Jayden has a crush on Talia but must compete with her because they are both SpiceMasters.
Will (Tommy Goodman): A chef who used to work at Lola's before moving to Fuccinelli's. He later returned to Lola's to steal their magic spices.

Episodes

Broadcast
Talia in the Kitchen made its global debut on Nickelodeon in the United States on July 6, 2015, right after the premiere of the fourth and final season of Every Witch Way. In India, the series debuted on Disney Channel on March 4, 2018. In Canada, the series premiered on September 7, 2015 on YTV.

References

External links

2010s American single-camera sitcoms
2010s American teen sitcoms
2010s Nickelodeon original programming
2015 American television series debuts
2015 American television series endings
English-language television shows
Nickelodeon telenovelas
YTV (Canadian TV channel) original programming
Television series about teenagers
Television shows set in Miami